Bob Cunningham (born 4 January 1953 in Musselburgh, Scotland) is a former Scotland international rugby union player.

Rugby Union career

He played for Preston Lodge.

He played for Gala.

He played for South of Scotland District; and was part of the 1978–79 Scottish Inter-District Championship winning side.

He had 3 caps for Scotland between 1978 and 1979.

References

1953 births
Living people
Rugby union props
Scotland international rugby union players
Gala RFC players
South of Scotland District (rugby union) players
Scottish rugby union players
Preston Lodge RFC players